William Reed Smith (11 August 1826 – 15 January 1894) was a Utah territorial politician and a leader of the Church of Jesus Christ of Latter-day Saints (LDS Church) in Utah

Early life
Smith was born in Yonge Township, Leeds County, Upper Canada, as the youngest of nine children born to Peter Smyth and Mary Read. Both of his parents died when he was very young, so at the age of two years and ten months he was taken in by neighbours, Samuel and Fanny Parrish, who raised him to adulthood. The Parrishes raised Smith in the Quaker religion.

In 1837, the Parrishes and Smith moved to Stark County, Illinois. In the late 1830s, as Latter Day Saints began gathering in nearby Nauvoo, the Parishes and Smith became interested in Mormonism. Smith was baptized into the Church of Jesus Christ of Latter Day Saints in 1841, on his 15th birthday.

LDS Church leadership in Utah
In 1849, Smith traveled to the Salt Lake Valley as a Mormon pioneer. In Utah Territory, Smith settled in Centerville. In 1855, Smith was appointed as the bishop of the LDS Church's Centerville Ward, and served in this position until 1877. During his time as bishop, Smith was involved in the Mormon Reformation, and accompanied Jedediah M. Grant in a tour of Utah in which the merits of rebaptism were presented. Smith himself was rebaptized on 29 September 1856.

Political career
In 1859, Smith was elected to represent Centerville in the House of Representatives of Utah Territory. He was elected to finish the unexpired term of Charles C. Rich, who had resigned so that he could travel to Europe as a missionary for the LDS Church. Smith was subsequently elected to full terms in the House of Representatives in 1860, 1862, and 1864. From 1874 to 1883, Smith was an elected probate judge in Davis County, Utah.

Later LDS Church leadership
From 1865 to 1867, Smith was a missionary for the LDS Church in England, Ireland, and Scotland. While traveling to and from Europe, he visited relatives in Ontario.

In 1874, Smith was appointed the president of the Centerville branch of the United Order. In 1877, Smith became the first president of the newly organized Davis Stake of the LDS Church, and he served in this position until his death. During his tenure, the first Primary of the LDS Church was organized in his stake boundaries by Aurelia Spencer Rogers.

In 1880, Smith became a member of the LDS Church's Council of Fifty, a body which advised the church on political, economic, and social issues affecting Latter-day Saints.

In 1885, Smith and two other men traveled to western Canada to examine the possibility of establishing Mormon colonies in the area. On this trip, the men investigated a number of potential settlement locations in Alberta south of Lethbridge. Smith purchased a tract of land, which was later settled as Spring Coulee, Alberta. Smith's investigations led to the establishment of Cardston by Charles Ora Card in 1887.

Bigamy conviction and pardon
Like many 19th-century members of the LDS Church, Smith practiced plural marriage, and had five wives simultaneously. In July 1887, Smith was arrested for violating the Morrill Anti-Bigamy Act. He pleaded guilty, and on 31 March 1888 was sentenced to six months' imprisonment and a $300 fine. Smith was imprisoned until 20 July 1888, when he was pardoned by U.S. President Grover Cleveland.

Death
Smith died in Centerville of "stricture of the bowels"—which today would probably have been identified as colorectal cancer. He was survived by three wives and 19 children.  Eleven additional children died at birth or pre-deceased him during childhood.

Notes

References

External links

1826 births
1894 deaths
19th-century American politicians
19th-century Mormon missionaries
American Mormon missionaries in England
American Mormon missionaries in Ireland
American Mormon missionaries in Scotland
American leaders of the Church of Jesus Christ of Latter-day Saints
American people convicted of bigamy
American prisoners and detainees
Canadian Latter Day Saints
Canadian Mormon missionaries
Canadian leaders of the Church of Jesus Christ of Latter-day Saints
Converts to Mormonism from Quakerism
Deaths from cancer in Utah
Deaths from colorectal cancer
Latter Day Saints from Illinois
Latter Day Saints from Utah
Members of the Utah Territorial Legislature
Mormon pioneers
People from Centerville, Utah
People from Stark County, Illinois
Pre-Confederation Canadian emigrants to the United States
Primary (LDS Church) people
Prisoners and detainees of the United States federal government
Recipients of American presidential pardons
Utah politicians convicted of crimes